In the English county of East Sussex, many former chapels, churches and other places of worship have been demolished without direct replacement. Declining congregations, structural problems, commercial redevelopment, wartime bombing and many other reasons have contributed to the loss of more than 70 buildings across the county. Several have been demolished in the seaside resorts of Eastbourne and Hastings and the hilltop town of Crowborough; elsewhere, tiny villages such as Magham Down and Iden have lost former chapels; and other churches have disappeared from isolated rural sites such as Ashdown Park and Twyford House, both in the heart of the dense Ashdown Forest which covers the northwest of the county.

Details of all places of public worship which have been completely demolished without direct replacement on the same site are recorded here. Private, hospital, school, prison and similar chapels are excluded, as are former churches which are ruinous but still extant—such as the former parish churches of Bulverhythe (St Mary's) and Ore (St Helen's), both in Hastings. Buildings demolished to allow a new church to be constructed on the same site are also excluded; but if a church was pulled down and a replacement was built on a different site, as at Pevensey Bay (St Wilfrid's Church) and Seaford (the Baptist church), details of the old building are given.

Many churches listed here were built during the 19th century and demolished after World War II. Although the government's scheme of statutory listing for buildings of special architectural and historic interest had started in the 1940s, it was—with a few exceptions—not until the late 20th century that churches and chapels of the Victorian era began to be given the protection from demolition or significant alteration which listed status confers. By 1980, nearly 80 of the approximately 600 Victorian places of worship across Sussex as a whole had been lost. Many demolition-threatened buildings survived by "pure chance, combined with the laudable initiative of a few private individuals": processes to preserve former churches that were no longer required, coordinated at a denominational or local level, never developed. Fewer places of worship have been lost since about 1980, as charitable bodies such as the Churches Conservation Trust, Friends of Friendless Churches and Historic Chapels Trust have become more influential and local initiatives have had more success: for example, in 2009 Bexhill-on-Sea residents successfully campaigned against the demolition of two churches within a month. Nevertheless, "a number of important demolitions" have affected the architecture and townscape of Hastings (among them Mount Pleasant Church, the Central Methodist Church, St Andrew's and St Paul's—"a building of fine quality erected ... at great cost"), Eastbourne (Pevensey Road Congregational Church, St Peter's Church and others) and other places.

Demolished places of worship

Gallery

See also

List of demolished places of worship in Brighton and Hove
List of demolished places of worship in West Sussex

Notes

References

Bibliography

 (Lecture on the 200th Anniversary of the Tabernacle congregation)

East Sus
Sussex, East
Former religious buildings and structures in East Sussex
Lists of buildings and structures in East Sussex